Leif Andersson may refer to:

Leif Erland Andersson (1944–1979), Swedish astronomer
Leif Andersson (biathlete) (born 1961), Swedish Olympic athlete
Leif Andersson (footballer), Swedish former footballer
Leif Andersson (animal geneticist) (born 1954), Swedish geneticist
Leif Anderson (1925–1999), Swedish jazz expert and radio personality
Leif Andersen (born 1971), Norwegian former footballer
Leif Andersen (rower) (1936–2014), Norwegian rower
Leif Andersson (Finnish rower) (born 1944), Finnish Olympic rower
Leif Andersson (wrestler) (born 1949), Swedish Olympic wrestler